Acoustic: Live at Stubb's is Reckless Kelly's first live album. It was recorded at Stubb's Bar-B-Q in Austin, Texas. The album features a cover of Bob Dylan's Subterranean Homesick Blues, which was originally recorded on his 1965 album, Bringing It All Back Home. Also covered are AC/DC's You Shook Me All Night Long and Led Zeppelin's Whole Lotta Love.

Track listing
"My Soul Ain't Sold" (Villanueva, Braun) – 4:10
"Hottest Thing in Town" (Shaver) – 8:15
"Don't Come Back" – 2:48
"Subterranean Homesick Blues" (Bob Dylan) – 2:44
"Wild Western Windblown Band" (Hauser) – 3:01
"She Sang the Red River Valley" (Bennett) – 4:20 
"Shook Me All Night Long" (Young, Johnson, Young) – 5:45
"You Should Be Gone" (Willy Braun) – 3:33
"My Baby Worships Me" (Steve Earle) – 3:22
"The Ballad of Tommy and Maria" (Poltz) – 4:11
"Strung Out and Wound" (Schelske, Braun) – 3:22
"Eight More Miles" (Braun) – 4:19
"Whole Lotta Love" (John Bonham, Willie Dixon, John Paul Jones, Jimmy Page, Robert Plant) – 16:40 
"Lovin' You" (Hidden Track)

Personnel 
 Willy Braun – Lead Vocals, guitar
 Cody Braun – Vocals, fiddle, mandolin, harmonica
 David Abeyta – lead guitar, vocals
 Jay Nazz (Nazziola) – drums
 Chris Schelske – bass

References

Reckless Kelly (band) albums
2000 live albums